The Ruhuna Rugby Football Union (RRFU) is the governing body for rugby union in Southern Province, Sri Lanka. Its president was Kumar Abeywardena until he resigned on June 12, 2010.

See also
 Sri Lanka Rugby Football Union

References

External links
 Official website
 Provincial Unions

Sri Lankan rugby union governing bodies
Rugby